Zabibah and the King ( Zabībah wal-Malik) is a romance novel, originally published anonymously in Iraq in 2000, that was written by Saddam Hussein.

Characters
Arab – The protagonist of the story, the novel follows 'Arab as he becomes king of Iraq. The character represents Saddam Hussein.
Zabibah (زبيبة) – A poor woman in an unhappy marriage, she is the love interest of 'Arab. Zabibah represents the people of Iraq.
Zabibah's husband – A cruel man. This unnamed character symbolizes the United States.
Hezkel – An emir and an antagonist to 'Arab. Zabibah lives in a small hut next to Hezkel's palace. Hezkel represents Israel.
Shamil – Another enemy of 'Arab, Shamil represents both Jews and merchants.
Nuri Chalabi – An antagonist to 'Arab and a feudal lord. His character represents Ahmed Chalabi, leader of the Iraqi National Congress, an American-funded Iraqi opposition movement.

Plot summary
The plot is a love story about a powerful ruler of medieval Iraq and a beautiful commoner girl named Zabibah.  Zabibah's husband is a cruel and unloving man who rapes her. The book is set in 7th or 8th century Tikrit, Hussein's home town. Although the book is on the surface a romance novel, it is (and was intended to be read as) an allegory. The hero is Hussein and Zabibah represents the Iraqi people.

The vicious husband is the United States and his rape of Zabibah represents the U.S. offensive against Iraqi forces at the end of the Gulf War, as illustrated by the date of the rape being January 17—the same date that U.S. led forces commenced the 1991 offensive that drove Iraq out of Kuwait. In the novel, the king dies after capturing the rapists and avenging the honor of Zabibah.

Distribution
The book was a best seller in Iraq when it was originally published for 1,500 dinars (about US$0.50). It is estimated that over one million copies were sold.

Royalties, according to the back cover, were to go to "the poor, the orphans, the miserable, the needy, and [other] charities". The Iraqi publishers appropriated four paintings by Canadian artist Jonathon Earl Bowser, to illustrate the novel, putting his "The Awakening" on the cover. Bowser did not authorize their use of his work and has attempted with no success to obtain compensation for copyright infringement.

Authorship
The U.S. CIA believes that it was written by ghostwriters with the direct influence of Saddam.

Adaptations

A twenty-part television series, and a musical based on it, were later produced.

Before its release, it was rumored that the Sacha Baron Cohen comedy film The Dictator (2012) was adapted from the novel.

The book is also featured in Matt Ruff's alternate history novel The Mirage (2012), where in the novel's narrative it serves as an equivalent to O. J. Simpson's If I Did It (2007).

See also

Saddam Hussein's novels

Footnotes

External links
Zabibah and the King cover art

2000 novels
Novels by Saddam Hussein
Iraqui romance novels
Works published anonymously
Novels set in Iraq
Novels about rape
Novels adapted into television shows
Novels adapted into plays
Antisemitic novels
Allegory
Antisemitism in Iraq